Petrophila cronialis is a moth in the family Crambidae. It was described by Herbert Druce in 1896. It is found in Mexico.

References

Petrophila
Moths described in 1896